Sarnia station (also Sarnia Tunnel Station) is a Via Rail train station in Sarnia, Ontario, Canada. It is the western terminus for Via Rail trains running from Toronto through southwestern Ontario. The unstaffed station is wheelchair accessible. The station includes vending machines, washrooms, a pay phone, and a medium-sized waiting area.

Train 84 leaves daily from Sarnia at 08:40, and returns as train 87 at 22:20.

The International Limited was operated jointly by Via Rail and Amtrak between Chicago and Toronto. The service, which had ended in 1971 by CN Rail, was restarted in 1982 and discontinued again in 2004 due to border delays and post-9/11.

Sarnia Transit Route 1 Confederation will service the railway station on request and the connection to Amtrak Blue Water route can be made from cross border taxis between Sarnia and Port Huron.

The Gothic Revival station was built in 1891 by the Grand Trunk Railway (and designed by engineer Joseph Hobson) and later acquired by VIA Rail through CN Rail.

See also

 List of designated heritage railway stations of Canada
 Rail transport in Ontario

References

External links

 Sarnia train station on VIARail.ca
 Sarnia on TrainWeb.org

Passenger rail transport in Sarnia
Rail infrastructure in Sarnia
Via Rail stations in Ontario
Railway stations in Lambton County
Grand Trunk Railway stations in Ontario
Designated heritage railway stations in Ontario
Former Amtrak stations in Canada
Buildings and structures in Sarnia